Decapod may refer to:

Biology
 Decapoda, an order of crustaceans such as lobsters and crabs
 Decapodiformes, ten-limbed cephalopods with eight arms and two tentacles

Trains
 2-10-0, a steam locomotive wheel arrangement known as "Decapod" in the United States
 Russian locomotive class Ye made in Russia and the United States
 0-10-0, a steam locomotive wheel arrangement known as "Decapod" in the United Kingdom
 GER Decapod, an experimental 0-10-0 steam locomotive built by the Great Eastern Railway

Fiction
 Decapodians, decapod-like fictional characters in the cartoon series Futurama
 "The Decapod", the third episode of the second series of the 1960s British television series The Avengers
 In the 2016 Disney film Moana, a crab named Tamatoa refers to himself as a decapod during the singing of the song "Shiny".

See also
 Monopod
 Tripod
 Tetrapod
 Hexapod (disambiguation)
 Octopod